Carpați can refer to:
Carpathian Mountains from Romania
Two residential districts in Satu Mare County, Romania:
Carpați I
Carpați II
A gun
Pistol Carpați Md. 1974
A cigarette brand
Carpați (cigarette)